Core Keeper is a survival sandbox game developed by Pugstorm. Currently in early access, the game features mechanics similar to other games in the sandbox genre such as Minecraft and Terraria, including mining, crafting, farming and exploration in a procedurally generated underground world. It was released to Steam in early access on 8 March 2022 and received praise for its game mechanics, art style, and tone and atmosphere.

Gameplay 
Core Keeper is a top-down sandbox game based around survival and crafting mechanics similar to games such as Minecraft and Terraria. It can be played single-player or cooperatively with up to 8 players. Players also have the ability to host a server which anyone can join at any time up to a maximum of 8 players. The game begins with a cutscene explaining the backstory of the player character before placing the character in a procedurally generated network of caverns. The starting location, called the Core chamber, is the same biome for all players, containing the same starting enemies and resources. It also contains three devices representing bosses that can be found and defeated within the game. It is a dark area at the beginning of the game but can be illuminated with the use of torches or a lantern. Torches can be made using gathered wood which is the first resource encountered in the area. 

The world is built up of square tiles of dirt and other materials which can be dug or mined to further explore the map and to gather resources. Blocks of ore glitter, helping players to know in which direction to dig to find them. Gathered resources can be used to craft tools and workbenches which unlock new items to craft. A furnace can also be crafted which allows the player to smelt ores to create weapons and armour. Players must also gather food to prevent their character from starving which occurs when their "hunger bar" becomes empty. This can be done by finding food in the world or by planting and watering seeds using a hoe and watering can. Later in the game, watering crops can be automated with the use of sprinklers. Additionally, fish can be caught in a fishing rhythm minigame using a fishing rod. Food can also be combined into meals using a cooking pot which can be crafted in the game. Meals cooked in this way provide an additional health boost and perks compared to naturally occurring food.

Exploration in the game is facilitated with an in-game map which can be opened as an overlay. It is also facilitated with the use of portals which allow the player to traverse great distances across the map. As players explore other areas of the game world, different biomes containing new resources and enemies are revealed. As enemies move around the game, they spread the environment in which they spawn, meaning that clearing an area of enemies requires cleaning the floor as well as defeating them. If a player dies during combat, they respawn at the Core in the starting area. They can retrieve their lost belongings by returning to the area where they died and reclaiming them from the tombstone dropped there. New regions also contain large boss enemies. Once defeated, bosses drop items that can be used to summon NPC merchants to live at the player's base. The first three bosses included in the game are Glurch the Abominous Mass, a giant, jumping, orange slime, Ghorm the Devourer, a massive insect creature that tunnels throughout the map, and The Hive Mother, a fleshy creature that spits acid and summons other enemies. Upon being defeated, these bosses drop items which can be used to activate the Core in the Core chamber, unlocking new items such as a drill for automatically mining ores and new bosses. Furthermore, whilst the areas accessible to the player are initially limited by a wall that surrounds the first few starting areas, upon activating the core this wall is removed, revealing new biomes and an infinitely generated map.

The game allows for a wide array of ways to play ranging from focusing on fighting bosses to avoiding bosses in favour of crafting and base-building. This is reflected in the game's skill system which rewards activities taken by the player with points to improve skills related to them. For example, running a lot improves the character's speed, mining resources improves the character's efficiency in mining, and fighting improves the character's strength. Players also choose a starting class during character creation before they begin the game which gives bonuses to specific skills and relevant starting resources. The look of the player character can also be customised by using vanity slots in the inventory.

Development and release 
Core Keeper was developed by Pugstorm and published by Fireshine Games. It was announced during an IGN livestream on 11 June 2021. It was launched in open alpha later that year for a period of two weeks from 1–14 December. A demo of the game was also released for Steam Next Fest In February 2022. It was then released to Steam in early access on 8 March 2022. It reached a quarter-million sales within a week and half a million in two weeks. PC Gamer attributed the early success in sales to positive coverage of the game from online streamers, reporting that the game had received almost 2 million views on Twitch by 23 March. The game reached 1 million sales by July 2022, having sold an additional 500,000 copies since the end of March.

The first seasonal event in the game, called "The Great Egg Hunt", ran from 13–19 April 2022 and added hidden eggs that could be combined to craft a Golden Egg item used to unlock hidden bonuses. The first major update for the game entitled "The Sunken Sea" was released on 15 June, introducing boats, islands and a new water biome to the game, as well as new fish, ores, enemies and weapons. A smaller update introducing cosmetic items called "Cozy Caverns" was released on 14 September, followed by a crossover with Terraria on 26 September that introduced a King Slime boss to the game, and a Halloween event called "Creepy Costume Party" that ran until 5 November. The next major update "The Desert of Beginnings" is set to release on 10 November and will introduce a new desert biome, two new bosses, go-karts and bug-hunting. A currently unnamed crystal biome is also planned to release in 2023.

Reception 
Rick Lane of NME compared the presentation of the game favourably to the 1997 game Dungeon Keeper for its underground setting, dark atmosphere and pixel art style. He felt that although the game's mechanics do "little to innovate or iterate" upon previous games in the genre such as Minecraft, its theme and tone "reframe the mechanics so that they don’t feel staid". He also felt that the game's choice to stick to well-known mechanics made it more immediately playable, even in its early access form. Nicole Clark of Polygon described the game as a "top-down Terraria" and compared it to other games in the sandbox genre, but argued that it isn't derivative because it "weaves tried-and-true survival sim elements into a tight play loop where the game is the grind in a way that feels meditative without being too repetitive." She also stated that the game "does a great job of slowly revealing its crafting system" and praised its ability to let the player learn by doing which she called "a rare quality in a genre that can be encumbered by many archaic rules and difficult-to-navigate screens." Jason Coles of PCGamesN praised features of the game that he felt gave implicit direction to the player on what to do, such as its introductory cutscene, starting location items, and crafting progression. Overall he felt that these features "result in a game that – like Minecraft – is built around crafting and survival, but offers a clear path forward for players who need a little more direction."

Christopher Livingstone of PC Gamer enjoyed the contrast between the game's "genuinely spooky areas and scary moments" and its "cozy, comfy, warm and happy Stardew Valley feel". He praised the "charming art and animation" as well as the fishing, farming and cooking aspects of the game. Harry Alston of TheGamer called the visual design of the game "gorgeous" and praised the combat as "straightforward but nuanced". He also praised the peaceful, slow living atmosphere of the game which he compared to Stardew Valley, concluding that "Core Keeper is comfortable, the sort of game that makes you feel nostalgic even though you’ve never played it before."

In April 2022, Vulture included the game on its list of "The Best Video Games of 2022 (So Far)", describing it as "[striking] a sublime balance between precarious dungeoneering and the cozy chores back home." In October 2022, Polygon listed Core Keeper as one of the best co-op management games. In November 2022, PCGamer described Core Keeper as the year's best co-op survival game.

Awards and nominations

References

External links 

 Official website

Upcoming video games
Early access video games
Multiplayer and single-player video games
Survival video games
Indie video games
Top-down video games
Open-world video games